Hryhoriy, sometimes Hryhory, may refer to:

Hryhory Alchevsky (1866–1920), prominent Ukrainian and minor Russian composer
Hryhoriy Baranets (born 1986), professional Ukrainian football midfielder
Hryhory Bazhul (1906–1989), Ukrainian bandurist
Hryhoriy Chernysh, candidate in the 2004 Ukrainian presidential election
Hryhoriy Chorny (died 1630), a Hetman of the Dnieper Cossacks from 1628 to 1630
Hryhoriy Hamarnik or Grigory Gamarnik (born 1929), former Soviet world champion wrestler
Hryhoriy Hrynko (1890–1938), Soviet Ukrainian statesman who held high office in the government of the Soviet Union
Hryhoriy Hulyanytsky (died 1679), Ukrainian Cossack colonel, a skilled warrior and a shrewd politician
Hryhoriy Illyashov (born 1965), former KGB operative, Ukrainian spy, and politician
Hryhoriy Khomyshyn, Ukrainian Greek Catholic bishop and martyr
Hryhoriy Kvitka-Osnovyanenko (1778–1843), Ukrainian writer, journalist, and playwright
Hryhoriy Kytastyi (1907–1984), Ukrainian émigré composer and conductor
Hryhoriy Loboda (born 1596), Kosh Otaman of the Zaporizhian Host (1593–6, with interruptions) of Romanian descent
Hryhory Nazarenko (1902–1997), bandura player
Hryhoriy Nemyria, Chairman of the Human Rights Committee of the Verkhovna Rada
Hryhoriy Nestor (1891–2007), claimed to be the oldest man in the world
Hryhoriy Petrovskiy (1878–1958), one of the most prominent Russian revolutionaries of Ukrainian origin
Hryhoriy Piatachenko (1932–2022), Ukrainian economist and politician
Hryhoriy Sakhnyuk (born 1987), professional and international Ukrainian football defender
Hryhoriy Skovoroda (1722–1794), Ukrainian and Russian philosopher, poet, teacher and composer
Hryhoriy Surkis (born 1949), Ukrainian businessman and politician, vice-president of UEFA
Hryhoriy Veryovka (1895–1964), Ukrainian composer, choir director, and teacher
Hryhoriy Yarmash (born 1985), Ukrainian football defender

See also
 Ryori
 Gregory (given name)

Ukrainian masculine given names